Walpole is the official body for the UK's luxury goods sector. It represents the interests of 270 British brands and members include Rolls-Royce, Burberry, Claridge's and Harrods. Its purpose is to promote, protect and develop a sector that in 2019 was estimated to be worth £48 billion to the UK economy.

History 
In 1990, the Churchill Group was founded by a collection of British companies, including British Airways, Coutts, DAKS Simpson, the Savoy Group and the Financial Times.

The aim was to ‘promote British excellence’. The name was changed to Walpole in 1992 in honour of Robert Walpole – the de facto first British Prime Minister.

In 2001, Walpole held the first of its annual awards ceremonies to celebrate British luxury brands, and in 2005, the group shifted its focus from promoting British excellence to promoting, protecting and developing British luxury and began proactively lobbying on behalf of its members in Westminster and Brussels.

In 2010, Walpole joined equivalent lobby groups in Italy (Altagamma), France (Comité Colbert), Germany (Meisterkreis) and Spain (Circulo Fortuny) to form the European Cultural and Creative Industries Alliance (ECCIA) and, in 2011, the EU Commission recognised ‘luxury’ as a sector in its own right.

London Business School formed a partnership with Walpole in 2013 to provide seminars and projects for MBA students. A report in the Financial Times noted that ‘Degrees in luxury goods, as well as degree tracks and executive short courses, have been popular in France for many years.’

2014 saw Walpole's then CEO Julia Carrick awarded an OBE in recognition of her services to British industry.

In 2017, and following the UK's decision to leave the EU, Walpole expressed concerns about the impact of Brexit on Britain's luxury sector. Current Walpole CEO Helen Brocklebank appeared on CNBC Europe saying that although the majority of customers for high-end UK products exist outside of Europe, many brands have ‘complex supply chains across Europe.’

The organisation launched its first ‘trade mission’ to New York in 2017 to promote the British luxury sector. The following year, former UK Secretary of State for International Trade Liam Fox joined Walpole's delegation as part of a four-day showcase of British brands in New York.

In 2019, the UK luxury sector was found to be worth £48 billion following a report commissioned by Walpole and analysed by international consultancy firm, Frontier Economics.

On 14 January 2020, Walpole launched its British Luxury Sustainability Manifesto in partnership with McKinsey & Company to encourage more luxury businesses to work towards a net carbon and zero waste future. The manifesto was signed by 70 brands including Harrods, Burberry and Dunhill. This was followed in 2021 by Walpole's first Sustainability Report.

Brands of Tomorrow 
In 2007, Walpole launched Brands of Tomorrow, a programme designed to mentor and provide support for British companies with a turnover of less than £5m that may lack the resources or expertise to grow.

Among the companies that have been part of the Brands of Tomorrow are watchmaker Bremont, jeweller Astley Clarke, independent retailer Wolf & Badger and fashion label GOAT.

Fashion designer Emilia Wickstead initially came through the London Business School-Walpole MBA programme before being selected as a Brand of Tomorrow in 2015.

References

External links 
 Official website

Trade associations based in the United Kingdom